Doll SZN Reloaded  is an EP by American rapper Asian Doll. It was released independently on April 8, 2020. The EP features a guest verse from King Von.

Singles
"Come Find Me" was released on April 1, 2020 and served as the lead single. A music video directed by Dead Fly Films was released on the same day.

Track list
Credits adapted from Tidal.

References

2020 mixtape albums